Kurixalus odontotarsus (serrate-legged small treefrog) is a species of frog in the family Rhacophoridae. It is found in southern China, Vietnam, Laos, and possibly Myanmar. Its natural habitats are subtropical or tropical moist lowland forests, subtropical or tropical moist montane forests, subtropical or tropical moist shrubland, intermittent freshwater marshes, heavily degraded former forest, and canals and ditches. It is threatened by habitat loss.

References

odontotarsus
Amphibians of China
Amphibians of Laos
Amphibians of Vietnam
Taxonomy articles created by Polbot
Amphibians described in 1993